John Lawson Burnett (January 20, 1854 – May 13, 1919) was a U.S. Representative from Alabama.

Life
Born in Cedar Bluff, Alabama, Burnett attended the common schools of the county, Wesleyan Institute, Cave Spring, Georgia, and the local high school at Gaylesville, Alabama.

Studies and early politics
He studied law and graduated from Vanderbilt University, Nashville, Tennessee.

In 1876, he was admitted to the bar in Cherokee County, Alabama and commenced practice in Gadsden thereafter. He served in the State House of Representatives in 1884 and as member of the State senate in 1886.

Election
Burnett was elected as a Democrat to the Fifty-sixth and to the ten succeeding Congresses and served from March 4, 1899, until his death.

He served as chairman of the Committee on Immigration and Naturalization (Sixty-second through Sixty-fifth Congresses). On April 5, 1917, John Lawson Burnett was one of the 50 representatives who voted against declaring war on Germany (World War I).

He served as member of the United States Immigration Commission 1907-1910. In 1907, Congressman John L. Burnett called Syrians "the most undesirable of the undesirable peoples of Asia Minor"

Death
John L. Burnett died in Gadsden, Alabama, May 13, 1919 and was interred in Forest Cemetery.

See also
List of United States Congress members who died in office (1900–49)

References

 John L. Burnett, late a representative from Alabama, Memorial addresses delivered in the House of Representatives and Senate frontispiece 1921

External links

1854 births
1919 deaths
People from Cherokee County, Alabama
Democratic Party members of the United States House of Representatives from Alabama
19th-century American politicians